Arthur Sansom may refer to:

 Art Sansom (1920–1991), American comic strip cartoonist
 Arthur Ernest Sansom (1838–1907), English physician